Allison Moorer (born June 21, 1972) is an American singer/songwriter. She signed with MCA Nashville in 1997 and made her debut on the U.S. Billboard Country Chart with the release of her debut single, “A Soft Place To Fall,” which she co-wrote with Gwil Owen. The song was featured in Robert Redford’s The Horse Whisperer and was nominated for an Academy Award for Best Original Song in 1999. Moorer performed at the Oscars ceremony the same year. She has made ten albums and has had songs recorded by Trisha Yearwood, Kenny Chesney, Miranda Lambert, Steve Earle, and Hayes Carll.

Biography

Early years
Moorer was born in Mobile, Alabama on June 21, 1972. She was raised in Frankville, Alabama, and later Monroeville, Alabama, after the deaths of her parents. Growing up, Moorer and her sister also lived in Jackson, Alabama at various times.  Music was an important part of the Moorer family. Moorer's father was a heavy drinker who abused his wife. In 1985, her mother fled with the two girls to nearby Mobile, but her father soon discovered their whereabouts. In 1986, when Moorer was 14 and her older sister Shelby (now Shelby Lynne) was 17, he shot and killed his wife before taking his own life. Moorer graduated from the University of South Alabama in Mobile in June 1993 and then moved to Nashville, Tennessee, without even collecting her diploma to join her sister, singer/songwriter Shelby Lynne, who lived there and had already released three albums. Moorer began singing backgrounds in Lynne's band full time and toured extensively with her.

Music career
In June 1996, Moorer took part in a tribute to her songwriter friend, the late Walter Hyatt, singing his "Tell Me Baby" at Nashville's Ryman Auditorium. Nashville agent Bobby Cudd was in attendance and subsequently introduced her to renowned producer and MCA Nashville president Tony Brown. After a few meetings, Brown asked her to cut some demos for the label. Two tracks—"Pardon Me" and "Call My Name”— from that session were included on her first MCA album, Alabama Song.

When Brown moved from MCA Records to sister label Universal South, Moorer followed. Her 2002 album, Miss Fortune, earned more raves, but didn't meet sales expectations. It contained the ballad "Tumbling Down,” which was featured on the soundtrack of the popular 2002 film The Rookie.

Her live album Show was recorded in one night at 12th and Porter in Nashville. It features the first recorded collaboration between Moorer and Lynne. After releasing Show and a DVD on Universal South, Moorer moved to independent label Sugar Hill Records. With a slightly rougher edge than past efforts, The Duel was released in April 2004. Moorer's first husband, Doyle Lee Primm, was featured as a songwriter on her first four albums. They divorced in 2005. After serving as his opening act on a European tour, Moorer married fellow singer/songwriter Steve Earle. Earle produced her 2006 album, Getting Somewhere. Moorer wrote all the songs, with the exception of one co-written with Earle. They were both nominated for the Best Country Collaboration with Vocals Grammy, for the song "Days Aren't Long Enough" from Earle's Washington Square Serenade in 2008. The song was also nominated for an Americana Music Association award. Moorer gave birth to the couple's first child, John Henry Earle, on April 5, 2010, but they separated in 2012 and divorced in 2015.

Moorer released the Buddy Miller-produced Mockingbird in February 2008;[4] an album mainly of covers of songs by female singer/songwriters including her sister, Shelby Lynne.

In 2009, Moorer performed in The People Speak, a documentary feature film that uses dramatic and musical performances of the letters, diaries, and speeches of everyday Americans, based on historian Howard Zinn's A People's History of the United States.[5] She appeared in the off-Broadway Rebel Voices, a dramatization of Howard Zinn and Anthony Arnove's Voices of a People's History of the United States in late 2007. Also, in 2009, she appeared on the BBC series Transatlantic Sessions, Series 4, Episodes 4 and 5, performing a version of the Irish folk song, "Carrickfergus”. She toured with the Jerry Douglas and Ally Bain led Transatlantic Sessions band in early 2011.

In 2015, Moorer released her ninth album, Down To Believing. The album marked a return to collaborating with Kenny Greenberg. 

On August 18, 2017, Moorer released her tenth album titled Not Dark Yet, in collaboration with her sister. Produced by British folk singer Teddy Thompson, it featured covers of songs by Merle Haggard, Bob Dylan, Nirvana and The Killers as well as one original song written by Moorer and Lynne, “Is It Too Much.” During an extended interview at the Country Music Hall of Fame, the duo revealed that they are planning a second collaborative album which will instead feature all original material and that they will begin writing together for this new project in 2018.

Moorer co-produced the 2019 Hayes Carll record, What It Is. She and Carll were married on May 12, 2019. Moorer's album Blood was to be released October 25, 2019; her book, Blood: A Memoir, was scheduled for publication on October 29, 2019, on Da Capo Press.

Discography

Studio albums

Live albums

Extended Plays

Compilation albums

Singles

A "Alabama Song" reached number 73 on the Canadian RPM Country Tracks chart.

Guest singles

A Song was credited on the charts to Kid Rock with Sheryl Crow or Allison Moorer.

Music videos

Collaborations
 Contributed vocals for two songs, "When She Passed By" and "A Perfect Hand", on David Byrne and Fatboy Slim's concept album, Here Lies Love (2009).
 Appears on two albums with The Chieftains: In 2003 on Further Down the Old Plank Road singing "Hick's Farewell" and in 2005 on Live From Dublin: A Tribute To Derek Bell singing "Carrickfergus".
 Performed with Steve Earle on the song "After the Fire is Gone" from Coal Miner's Daughter: A Tribute To Loretta Lynn (2010).
Performed the female lead vocals in a reworked version Kid Rock's hit "Picture". The song was co-written and originally recorded with Sheryl Crow. Rock's label, Atlantic Records, was unable to obtain permission from Crow's label, A&M Records, to release the original version as a single, thus it was rerecorded with Moorer.
Has often toured and recorded vocals with Steve Earle since 2006, and was a member of his band the Dukes and Duchesses.
 Duets with Josh Turner on the Hank Williams song "Alone and Forsaken", which appears on his 2020 album Country State of Mind.

Bibliography
Blood: A Memoir (2019) - published by Hachette Book Group
I Dream He Talks to Me: A Memoir of Learning How to Listen (2021) - published by Hachette Book Group

Awards and nominations

References

External links

 Allison Moorer official website
 CMT.com profile
 
 Allison Moorer at NPR Music
 Articles.latimes.com
 

1972 births
Living people
People from Monroeville, Alabama
American women country singers
American country singer-songwriters
Place of birth missing (living people)
MCA Records artists
Show Dog-Universal Music artists
Country musicians from Alabama
Rykodisc artists
Singer-songwriters from Alabama
21st-century American singers
21st-century American women singers
Proper Records artists
Sugar Hill Records artists